Savidan may refer to:
Savidan, Iran, a village in Kerman Province, Iran
Billy Savidan (1902-1991), New Zealand athlete
Patrick Savidan (born 1965), French philosopher
Steve Savidan (born 1978), French footballer

Surnames of Breton origin